William Robinson (November 5, 1823 – July 21, 1912) was an Ontario businessman and political figure. He represented Kingston in the Legislative Assembly of Ontario as a Conservative member from 1871 to 1879.

He was born in Ballymoney, County Antrim, Ireland, in 1823. Robinson was president of the Kingston and Marmora Railway. He served on the town council for Kingston for 16 years and served as mayor from 1869 to 1870. He was later appointed a customs officer at Kingston. He married Margaret Dick, daughter of David Dick. She had come to Canada from County Down, Ireland in 1840 with her parents. On September 15, 1850. She was also an Irish immigrant. The wedding was officiated by Reverend Reid in Cooke's Presbyterian Church. He had four sons and three daughters. He died on July 21, 1912. His obituary was published in the Daily British Whig on July 22, 1912.

He worked as a painter for over thirty years before retiring and taking an appointment as Clerk of the Division Court, where he stayed for eleven years. His son William then took over the post. He served on the City Council in several positions for over 38 years, including being the Alderman for the Rideau Ward, Mayor in 1869-70, and as the Alderman for the Cataraqui Ward in 1897. He was a member of the Ontario Legislature, first elected as an independent in 1870 and again as a Liberal in 1874. He elected as an independent was a notable historic occasion in Ontario's history.  He negotiated to the legislature on behalf of the Kingston and Pembroke Railway and secured a $121 000.000 bond toward the building of it.

Robinson was a Justice of Peace for over forty years, but when the Tories were brought into Toronto in 1905 they relieved him from the post.

While in office, he was responsible for exposing the corruption of the City Chamberlain and the Tax Collectors by exposing that a sum reaching nearly $16 000.00 was missing from city accounts.

Robinson once said that he had only cast one Tory vote in his life, and that was when two conservatives were running in Frontenac County. "Of two evils, I chose the lesser".

External links 

The Canadian parliamentary companion and annual register, 1878, CH Mackintosh

1823 births
1912 deaths
Mayors of Kingston, Ontario
People from Ballymoney
Progressive Conservative Party of Ontario MPPs